Dvora Waysman is an Australian-Israeli author.

Biography 
Dorothy Opas (later Dvora Waysman) was born in Melbourne, Victoria. She made aliyah to Israel in 1971 with her husband and four children. The family settled in Jerusalem.

Her writings are syndicated worldwide in over 20 publications. Waysman is a contributor to The Jewish Press. Her topics include travel-related, family life experiences and Jewish holidays. Examples from her knowledge of Jewish History are often part of what she writes.
Waysman has taught creative writing and journalism for three decades.

Waysman's novel The Pomegranate Pendant was made into a movie in 2009. It premiered at the Jerusalem Film Festival in 2012.

Awards and recognition
Waysman was the 1981  recipient of the "For Jerusalem" citation for her fiction, poems and features about the city of Jerusalem, and has won the Seeff Award for Best Foreign Correspondent in 1988. In 2014, the movie based on her book, The Golden Pomegranate, won the Shabazi Prize for Literature and Art.

Published works

Books 
 In A Good Pasture, Mazo Publishers, Nov. 2008
 Seeds Of The Pomegranate, Mazo Publishers
 The Pomegranate Pendant, Mazo Publishers, Jan. 2007
 Esther, A Jerusalem Love Story, Health Communications
 Jewish Detective Stories For Kids
 My Jewish Days of the Week, Hachai Publishing. Artwork by Melanie Schmidt.

Short stories 
 "Dorothy's Diary"

References 

Year of birth missing (living people)
Living people
Australian emigrants to Israel
Australian women journalists
Australian journalists
Australian women novelists
Israeli Jews
Israeli people of Australian-Jewish descent
Israeli women journalists
Israeli women novelists
Israeli novelists
Jewish Australian writers
Jewish women writers
Writers from Melbourne